The following is a list of the 31 cantons of the Puy-de-Dôme department, in France, following the French canton reorganisation which came into effect in March 2015:

 Aigueperse
 Ambert
 Aubière
 Beaumont
 Billom
 Brassac-les-Mines
 Cébazat
 Chamalières
 Châtel-Guyon
 Clermont-Ferrand-1
 Clermont-Ferrand-2
 Clermont-Ferrand-3
 Clermont-Ferrand-4
 Clermont-Ferrand-5
 Clermont-Ferrand-6
 Cournon-d'Auvergne
 Gerzat
 Issoire
 Lezoux
 Maringues
 Les Martres-de-Veyre
 Les Monts du Livradois
 Orcines
 Pont-du-Château
 Riom
 Saint-Éloy-les-Mines
 Saint-Georges-de-Mons
 Saint-Ours
 Le Sancy
 Thiers
 Vic-le-Comte

References